Olybrius:
 Quintus Clodius Hermogenianus Olybrius, consul in 379
 Anicius Hermogenianus Olybrius, consul in 395
 Anicius Olybrius, Western Roman emperor in 472
 Anicius Olybrius, consul in 491
 Olybrius, consul in 526